Ibrahim Abiriga (5 June 1956 – 8 June 2018) also known as Abiriga Ibrahim Yusuf Abdalla, was a Ugandan politician and military officer.

He was the elected member of parliament for the Arua Municipality Constituency in the 10th Parliament from 2016 to 2018.  On 8 June 2018, Abiriga was shot and killed near his home in Kawanda. He was buried on 12 June 2018 in Arua.

References 

1956 births
2018 deaths
Ugandan murder victims
Members of the Parliament of Uganda
Assassinated Ugandan politicians
Ugandan military personnel
People from Arua District